This is a list of prominent people who were born in or lived for a significant period of time in U.S. state of Wyoming.

The arts

Acting

 Burnu Acquanetta (1921–2004), actress and model; born in Cheyenne
 Jim Beaver (born 1950), actor; born in Laramie
 Jim J. Bullock (born 1955), actor; born in Casper
 Darren Dalton (born 1965), actor; born in Powell
 Mickey Daniels (1914–1970), actor; born in Rock Springs
 Matthew Fox (born 1966), actor; raised in Crowheart
 Jesse Garcia (born 1982), actor; born in Rawlins
 Mildred Harris (1901–1944), actress; born in Cheyenne
 Cecilia Hart (1948–2016), actress; born in Cheyenne
 Kirby Heyborne (born 1976), actor; born in Evanston
 Isabel Jewell (1907–1972), actress; born in Shoshoni
 Michael Pearlman (born 1972), actor; lives in Jackson
 Jim Siedow (1920–2003), actor; born in Cheyenne
 Wally Wales (1895–1980), actor; born in Sheridan
 Larry Wilcox (born 1947), actor; raised in Rawlins

Literature

 Craig Arnold (born 1967), poet; teaches at the University of Wyoming; lives in Laramie
 C. J. Box, author of the Joe Pickett series of novels
 Maxwell Struthers Burt (1882–1954), novelist
 James A. "Jim" Corbett (1933–2001), writer, philosopher, and human-rights activist; born in Casper
 Gretel Ehrlich, novelist
 Joe Clifford Faust, novelist
 Alexandra Fuller (born 1969), writer, author of Don't Let's Go to the Dogs Tonight; lives in Jackson Hole
 Kathleen O'Neal Gear (born 1954), writer
 W. Michael Gear (born 1955), writer
 Dan Hausel (born 1949), author of several geology books in Wyoming
 Grace Raymond Hebard (1861–1936), western history writer whose findings regarding Sacajawea and Esther Hobart Morris tend to be challenged by contemporary historians
 Craig A. Johnson (born 1961), author of the Walt Longmire Mysteries; lives in Ucross, Wyoming
 George Clayton Johnson (1929–2015), co-author of the novel Logan's Run; born in Cheyenne
 Theodore Judson, science-fiction writer
 Patricia MacLachlan (1938-2022), children's book writer; her book Sarah, Plain and Tall won the Newbery Medal; born in Cheyenne
 Rodger McDaniel (born 1948), legislator, attorney, pastor, author of Dying for Joe McCarthy's Sins: The Suicide of Senator Lester Hunt; from Cheyenne
 Kyle Mills (born 1966), writer; lives in Jackson Hole
 Florabel Muir (1889–1970), newspaper reporter and columnist; born in Rock Springs
 Edgar Wilson Nye (1850–1896), journalist and humorist; postmaster of Laramie City in the Wyoming Territory
 Todd Parr (born 1962), children's book writer, artist, children's television show producer; grew up in Rock Springs
 E. Annie Proulx (born 1935), writer; author of the short story "Brokeback Mountain"; lives in Wyoming
 Chip Rawlins, non-fiction writer, outdoorsman; lives in Laramie
 Tracy Ringolsby, sports writer, born and lives in Cheyenne, fifth generation
 David Romtvedt, Poet Laureate of Wyoming
 Owen Wister (1860–1938), writer of Western novels

Music 
 Scott Avett (born 1976), musician; member of The Avett Brothers; born in Cheyenne
 John Perry Barlow (1947–2018), Grateful Dead lyricist; co-founder of the Electronic Frontier Foundation; retired cattleman; born in Jackson Hole
 Ronnie Bedford (1931–2014), jazz musician; music professor at Northwest College in Powell
 Richard Kermode (1946–1996), keyboardist; played with Janis Joplin, Malo and Santana, born in Lovell
 Chris LeDoux (1948–2005), country music singer-songwriter, bronze sculptor and rodeo champion (professional bareback rider); lived in Kaycee
 Charlie Martineau, musician
 Teenage Bottlerocket, punk rock band from Laramie

Television 
 Curt Gowdy (1919–2006), sportscaster; born in Green River
 Ian James Lee, CNN correspondent; born in Lander
 Pete Williams, NBC news correspondent; born in Casper

Visual arts

 Earl W. Bascom (1896–1992), painter, sculptor, "Cowboy of Cowboy Artists", "Dean of Rodeo Cowboy Sculpture"; lived in Rock Springs
 Elsa Spear Byron (1896–1992), photographer; born in Big Horn; lived most of her life in Sheridan
 Jackson Pollock (1912–1956), artist; born in Cody
 Floyd Shaman (1935–2005), sculptor; born in Wheatland
 Penny Wolin (born 1953), photographer; author of "The Jews of Wyoming: Fringe of the Diaspora" and "Descendants of Light: American Photographers of Jewish Ancestry"; born in Cheyenne

Other
 Tony Andruzzi (1925–1991), magician; born in Cheyenne
 Robyn Johnson (born 1985), Miss Wyoming USA 2007
 Melba Ogle (born 1942), model; born in Cheyenne
 Lyle Waggoner (1935–2020), actor, sculptor; lives in Jackson

Politics and public office

A–G

 Thurman Arnold (1891–1969), associate judge of the Court of Appeals for the D. C. Circuit
 Amos W. Barber (1861–1915), Governor of Wyoming (1890–1893)
 John Barrasso (born 1952), Republican U.S. Senator from Wyoming (since 2007)
 Frank A. Barrett (1892–1962), U.S. Senator, Representatives, Governor of Wyoming
 Eli Bebout (born 1946), Republican gubernatorial nominee (2002); member of the Wyoming State Senate (since 2007)
 Mary Bellamy (1861–1954), first woman elected to the Wyoming Legislature
 Eliza Stewart Boyd (1833–1912), 
 Bryant Butler Brooks (1861–1944), Governor of Wyoming (1905–1911)
 Anne Gorsuch Burford (1942–2004), first female administrator of the Environmental Protection Agency; born in Casper
 Harriet Elizabeth Byrd (1926–2015), first African American elected to the Wyoming Legislature
 John Allen Campbell (1835–1880), first governor of the Wyoming Territory (1869–1875)
 Joseph M. Carey (1845–1924), Governor of Wyoming, first U.S. Senator from Wyoming
 Robert D. Carey (1878–1937), Governor of Wyoming (1919–1923), U.S. Senator (1930–1937)
 Vincent Carter (1891–1972), U.S. Representative (1929–1935)
 Cale Case (born 1958), Wyoming state senator from Lander (since 1998)
 Fenimore Chatterton (1860–1958), Acting Governor of Wyoming (1903–1905)
 Dick Cheney (born 1941), Vice-President of the United States; raised in Casper; lives in Jackson Hole
 Lynne Cheney (born 1941), member of the American Enterprise Institute for Public Policy Research; chairwoman of the National Endowment for the Humanities; wife of Dick Cheney; born in Casper
 Alonzo M. Clark (1868–1952), Governor of Wyoming (1931–1933)
 Clarence D. Clark (1851–1930), member of the Wyoming constitutional convention, U.S. Representative (1890–1893), U.S. Senator (1895–1917)
 Tom Coburn (1948–2020), Junior Republican Senator from Oklahoma; born in Casper
 Henry A. Coffeen (1841–1912), U.S. Representative (1893–1895)
 Arthur G. Crane (1877–1955), Governor of Wyoming (1949–1951)
 Patrick Crank, Attorney General of Wyoming (2002–2007)
 Edward D. Crippa, interim U.S. Senator (1954)
 Barbara Cubin (born 1946), U.S. Representative (1995–2009)
 W. G. Curtis, founder and mayor of Torrington; Wyoming State representative
 Stephen Wheeler Downey (1839–1902), Wyoming territorial government leader; member of the Wyoming congressional convention; University of Wyoming trustee and president
 Frank Emerson (1882–1931), Governor of Wyoming (1926–1931)
 Mike Enzi (1944–2021), U.S. Senator (1997–2021)
 Dave Freudenthal (born 1950), Governor of Wyoming (2003–2011)
 Nancy Freudenthal (born 1954), judge on the United States District Court for the District of Wyoming
 Jack R. Gage (1899–1970), Governor of Wyoming (1961–1963)
 Jim Geringer (born 1944), Governor of Wyoming (1995–2003)
 Paul Ranous Greever (1891–1943), U.S. Representative (1935–1938); mayor of Cody

H–M

 Clifford Hansen (1912–2009), Governor of Wyoming (1963–1967), U.S. Senator (1967–1978)
 William Henry Harrison (1896–1990), Republican U.S. Representative from Wyoming (1950s and 1960s)
 Stanley K. Hathaway (1924–2005), Governor of Wyoming (1967–1975), U.S. Secretary of the Interior (1975)
 Edgar Herschler (1918–1990), Governor of Wyoming (1975–1987)
 John J. Hickey (1911–1970), U.S. Senator (1961–1962)
 Frank O. Horton (1882–1948), U.S. Representative (1939–1941)
 Lester C. Hunt (1892–1954), Governor of Wyoming (1943–1949); U.S. Senator (1949–1954)
 John B. Kendrick (1857–1933), Governor of Wyoming (1915–1917), U.S. Senator (1917–1933)
 Frank E. Lucas (1876–1948), Republican Governor of Wyoming (1924–1925)
 Cynthia Lummis (born 1954), former Republican member of both houses of the Wyoming legislature and former state treasurer
 Randall Luthi (born 1953), former Speaker of the Wyoming House of Representatives
 Max Maxfield (born 1945), Republican secretary of state of Wyoming
 Rodger McDaniel (born 1948), Democrat, House of Representatives (1970–1976), Wyoming Senate (1976–1980), attorney; author of biography of U.S. Senator Lester C. Hunt (2013)
 Gale W. McGee (1915–1992), U.S. Senator (1959–1977)
 John J. McIntyre (1904–1974), U.S. Representative (1941–1943); Wyoming Supreme Court Justice
 Ron Micheli, former Republican member of Wyoming Legislature, former Wyoming Director of Agriculture
 Leslie A. Miller (1886–1970), Governor of Wyoming (1932–1939)
 Franklin Wheeler Mondell (1860–1939), U.S. Representative (1895–1897; 1899–1923)

N–Z

 Joseph C. O'Mahoney (1884–1962), U.S. Senator (1934–1953; 1954–1961)
 John Eugene Osborne (1858–1943), Governor of Wyoming (1892–1895), U.S. Representative (1987–1999)
 Dana Perino (born 1972), 26th White House Press Secretary
 Nellie Tayloe Ross (1876–1977), Governor of Wyoming (1925–1927), first female governor of a U.S. state
 DeForest Richards (1846–1903), Governor of Wyoming (1899–1903)
 William A. Richards (1849–1912), Governor of Wyoming (1895–1899)
 Edward V. Robertson (1881–1963), U.S. Senator (1943–1949)
 Teno Roncalio (1916–2003), U.S. Representative (1965–1967; 1971–1978)
 William B. Ross (1873–1924), Governor of Wyoming (1923–1924)
 Tom Sansonetti, Assistant U.S. Attorney General for the Environment and Natural Resources Division of the Justice Department
 Henry H. Schwartz (1869–1955), U.S. Senator (1937–1943)
 Bryan Sharratt (1947–2007), member of Clinton administration defense team; Democratic candidate for Congress (1988), having been defeated by Dick Cheney
Alan K. Simpson (born 1931), U.S. Senator (1979–1997)
Milward L. Simpson (1897–1993), Republican governor and U.S. Senator from Wyoming
 Mike Sullivan (born 1939), Governor of Wyoming (1987–1995)
 Patrick Joseph Sullivan (1865–1935), mayor of Casper; U.S. Senator (1929–1930)
 Patrick Sullivan (1880–1959), Wyoming State Representative (1913–1917)
 John Thayer (1820–1906), Governor of Wyoming Territory (1875–1878)
 Craig L. Thomas (1930–2007), U.S. Senator (1995–2007)
 Edwin Keith Thomson (1919–1960), U.S. Representative (1955–1960)
 Thyra Thomson (1916–2013), Wyoming Secretary of State (1962–1987)
 Malcolm Wallop (1933–2011), U.S. Senator (1977–1995)
 Francis E. Warren (1844–1929), Governor of Wyoming (1890), U.S. Senator (1890–1893; 1895–1929)
 James G. Watt (born 1938), U.S. Secretary of the Interior (1981–1983)
 Charles E. Winter (1870–1948), U.S. Representative (1923–1929)
 John S. Wold (1916–2017), U.S. Representative (1969–1971)

Sportspeople

 Adam Archuleta (born 1977), professional football player; born in Rock Springs
 Zane Beadles (born 1986), professional football player; born in Casper
 Nick Bebout (born 1951), professional football player; played for the University of Wyoming; born in Riverton
 Jim Benepe (born 1963), professional golfer; born in Sheridan
 Jacob Bobenmoyer (born 1997), NFL long snapper for the Denver Broncos; Born in Cheyenne
 Bill Briggs (born 1943), pioneer in ski mountaineering, lives in Jackson Hole
 Tom Browning (born 1960), MLB pitcher; born in Casper
 John Buck (born 1980), MLB catcher, born in Kemmerer
 Karen Budge (born 1949), former World Cup and Olympic alpine ski racer; born in Jackson
 Jaycee Carroll (born 1983), professional basketball player; born in Laramie
 Gail Cogdill (1937–2016), professional football player; born in Worland
 Chris Cooley (born 1982), professional football player; born in Powell
 Alicia Craig (born 1982), distance runner; born in Gillette
 Jesseca Cross (born 1975), Olympic athlete; born in Laramie
 Lance Deal (born 1961), Olympic athlete; born in Riverton; attended high school in Casper
 Mike Devereaux (born 1963), MLB outfielder; NLCS MVP in 1995 with the Atlanta Braves; born in Casper
 Boyd Dowler (born 1937), professional football player; born in Rock Springs
 Aaron Elling (born 1978), professional football player; played for the University of Wyoming; lived in Lander
 Dick Ellsworth (born 1940), MLB pitcher; born in Lusk
 Rulon Gardner (born 1971), wrestler; Olympic gold medalist in Greco-Roman wrestling; born in Afton
 John Godina (born 1972), shot putter; three-time world champion; two-time Olympic medalist; lived in Cheyenne
 W. Dan Hausel (born 1949), hall-of-fame karate and kobudo grandmaster
 Jerry Hill (born 1939), professional football player; born in Torrington
 Bryan Iguchi (born 1973), snowboarder; 1997 X-Games bronze medalist in half-pipe; lives in Jackson Hole
 James Johnson (born 1987), professional basketball player for the Toronto Raptors; born in Cheyenne
 Jaelin Kauf (born 1996), Olympic freestyle skier; born in Alta
 Brett Keisel (born 1978), professional football player for the Pittsburgh Steelers; born in Greybull
 Mike Lansing (born 1968), MLB infielder; born in Rawlins
 Nate Marquardt (born 1979), Ultimate Fighting Championship middleweight fighter; born in Lander
 Bryce Meredith (born 1995), professional MMA fighter, three-time NCAA Division I wrestling All-American and two-time National Finalist; born in Cheyenne
 Tommy Moe (born 1970), world-class alpine skier; two-time Olympic medalist; member of the National Ski Hall of Fame; lives in Jackson Hole
 Heather Moody (born 1973), water polo player; two-time Olympic medalist; lived in Green River
 Jonah Nickerson (born 1985), pitcher for the Oregon State Beavers; born in Casper
 Brandon Nimmo (born 1993), outfielder for New York Mets; born in Cheyenne
 Jay Novacek (born 1962), professional football player; played college football at the University of Wyoming
 Gail O'Brien (1911–1978), professional football player; born in Cheyenne
 Brady Poppinga (born 1979), professional football player; born in Evanston
 Chris Prosinski (born 1987), professional football player; born in Newcastle
 Travis Rice (born 1982), professional snowboarder; co-producer of documentary films That's It, That's All (2008) and The Art of Flight (2011); born and raised in Jackson Hole
 Ken Sailors (1921–2016), professional basketball player; popularized the jump shot; member of the National Collegiate Basketball Hall of Fame; raised outside Hillsdale, Wyoming; played college basketball at the University of Wyoming
 Todd Skinner (1958–2006), rock climber; born in Pinedale
 Rick Sofield (born 1956), MLB outfielder; born in Cheyenne
 Josef Stiegler (born 1937), world-class alpine skier; three-time Olympic medalist in slalom and giant slalom; lives in Jackson Hole
 Resi Stiegler (born 1985), alpine skier; born and raised in Jackson Hole
 John Wendling (born 1983), professional football player; born in Cody
 Jamila Wideman (born 1975), left-handed point guard basketball player, lawyer and activist
 Logan Wilson (born 1996), professional football player for the Cincinnati Bengals; born and raised in Casper

Miscellaneous

 Thurman Arnold (1891–1969), lawyer and judge; born in Laramie
 Edward L. Baker Jr. (1865–1913), United States Army; recipient, Medal of Honor; born in Laramie County
 Harold Roe Bartle (1901–1974), lawyer; politician; helped to establish Scouting in Wyoming
 George T. Beck (1856–1943), politician; businessman; helped William Cody establish the town of Cody
 "Buffalo Bill" Cody (1846–1917), Old West figure; helped create Cody
 John Colter (1774–1813), explorer; first white man to set foot in Wyoming
 Clayton Danks (1879–1970), model cowboy on the Wyoming trademark, the Bucking Horse and Rider; winner of three competitions at Cheyenne Frontier Days
 Black Elk (1863–1950), heyoka of the Oglala Lakota people
 Otto Franc (1846–1903), cattle baron and homesteader in the Big Horn Basin
 Lilian Heath, first female doctor in Wyoming
 James L. Herdt, Master Chief Petty Officer of the Navy; born in Casper
 Leonard S. Hobbs (1896–1977), aeronautical engineer and author; won the 1952 Collier Trophy for designing the P&W J57 turbojet engine; born in Carbon County
 Raymond A. Johnson, aviation pioneer
 Harold McCracken (1894–1983), creator and director of the Buffalo Bill Historical Center in Cody
 M. Margaret McKeown (born 1951), U.S. Appeals Court Judge; born in Casper
 Esther Hobart Morris (1814–1902), appointed first female judge in United States in 1870 to complete the term of a justice who resigned in protest of the Wyoming Territory's passage of women's suffrage
 Margaret Murie (1902–2003), conservationist; lived in Wyoming
 John Pedersen, firearms designer who worked for Remington Arms
 Chance Phelps (1985–2004), soldier; born in Dubois
 Matthew Shepard (1976–1998), murdered student from the University of Wyoming; born in Casper
 Jedediah Smith (1799–1831), mountain man, trapper, explorer; first American to get to California from the East
 Gerry Spence (born 1929), lawyer; born in Laramie
 Willis Van Devanter (1859–1941), city attorney for Cheyenne; chief judge of Wyoming territorial court
 Robert R. Wilson (1914–2000), physicist; a group leader of the Manhattan Project; born in Frontier

References 

Lists of people from Wyoming